Enviken is a locality situated in Falun Municipality, Dalarna County, Sweden with 609 inhabitants in 2010.  Residents of Enviken are known to harbor a nostalgia for mid-20th century Americana complete with a fondness for rockabilly and classic American automobiles.

Enviken is also the name of a record company in the Swedish province of Dalarna.

References 

Populated places in Dalarna County
Populated places in Falun Municipality